Cymodoce may refer to:

 Cymodoce (crustacean), a genus of isopod in the family Sphaeromatidae
 Cymodoce (mythology), a Nereid (sea nymph) in Greek mythology

See also
 
 Cymodocea, a genus of grass